Masoud Hassan (Arabic:مسعود حسن) (born 20 July 1987) is an Emirati footballer. He currently plays as right back .

External links

References

Emirati footballers
1987 births
Living people
Al-Nasr SC (Dubai) players
Emirates Club players
Ajman Club players
Al-Shaab CSC players
Fujairah FC players
Al Urooba Club players
Khor Fakkan Sports Club players
UAE First Division League players
UAE Pro League players
Association football defenders